Peter Cooper (1791–1883) was an American industrialist, inventor and philanthropist.

Pete or Peter Cooper may also refer to:
 Pete Cooper (golfer) (1914–1993), American golfer
 Pete Cooper (musician), English fiddler
 Peter Cooper (journalist) (born 1960), Internet publisher, financial journalist and author
 Peter Cooper Hewitt (1861–1921), American electrical engineer
 Stuyvesant Town–Peter Cooper Village, Manhattan, New York
 Peter Cooper (author) (1929–2007), British RAF pilot and author
 Peter James Cooper, American film producer and writer
 Peter Cooper (footballer) (born 1935), Australian rules footballer
 Peter Cooper (psychopathologist), British academic